Iveragh is a rural locality in the Gladstone Region, Queensland, Australia.

Geography 
The Bruce Highway enters the locality from the east (Foreshores) and exits to the north (Tannum Sands).

The North Coast railway line enters the locatity from the east (Foreshores) and exits to the north-west (Benaraby). The locality is served by: 

 Rodds Bay railway station, now abandoned.

 Iveragh railway station.

Iveragh has the following mountains:

 Inkerman Peak 
 Mercy Hill 
 Mount Castletower 
 Mount Coulston

History 
Iveragh State School opened in 1922 in a school building relocated from the Toolooa State School. It was on a  land parcel. The school closed in 1940.

Education 
There are no schools in Iveragh. The nearest government primary school is Benaraby State School in neighbouring Benaraby to the north-west. The nearest govenrment secondary school is Tannum Sands State High School in neighbouring Tannum Sans to the north..

References

Further reading 

 

Gladstone Region
Localities in Queensland